Yadgir railway station, (station code: YG)   is an Indian Railways train station located in Yadgir in the Indian state of Karnataka and serves Yadagiri area. It is located on the –(Excl)  line of in South Central Railway zone.

History
Yadgir was on the two great railway systems of yesteryears – the Great Indian Peninsula Railway and Madras Railway. While the former started construction from Mumbai, the latter from Chennai. The two systems met at Raichur in 1871.

Structure and expansion 
Yadgir railway station has three platforms, each running to 650 meters in length, computerized reservation counter, waiting room, tea stall, parking, foot overbridge, and toilet facilities. Yadgir has connectivity with Bengaluru, Pune, Hyderabad,  Latur, Aurangabad and Mumbai, Delhi.

References

Railway stations in Karnataka
Railway stations in Yadgir district
Guntakal railway division